Elizabeth Lynch may refer to:

 Bet Lynch, fictional character from the TV soap opera Coronation Street
 Liz McColgan (née Lynch; born 1964), Scottish long-distance runner